The Sunshine Tour is a men's professional golf tour based in Southern and East Africa. For much of its early history it was known either as the South African Tour or Sunshine Circuit; through sponsorship deals, it has also been known as the Vodacom Tour and the FNB Tour. For the 2000–01 season the tour rebranded itself as the Sunshine Tour in an attempt to broaden its appeal. A large majority of the tour events are still staged in South Africa.

The tour is one of the six leading men's tours which before 2009 made up the membership of the International Federation of PGA Tours, but it offers much less prize money than some of the leading tours, and leading Southern African golfers traditionally prefer to play on the PGA Tour or the European Tour if they can qualify to do so, typically returning to play in Sunshine Tour events a couple of times a year.

Most of the tour's leading official money events, including the South African Open, are co-sanctioned with the European Tour to attract stronger fields.  The 2015 season included 27 official money events. The co-sanctioned events had purses ranging from €1 million to $6.5 million, while the other 21 events had purses designated in South African Rand and ranging from 650,000 rand to 4.5 million rand. There was at least one tournament every month of the year except July, but the main events took place in the South African summer from November to February.

The tour has been open to non-White players since 1991. Five black golfers have won events: South Africa's John Mashego at the 1991 Bushveld Classic; South Africa's Lindani Ndwandwe at the 2001 Western Cape Classic and 2009 Highveld Classic; Zimbabwe's Tongoona Charamba at the 2006 SAA Pro-Am Invitational and 2008 MTC Namibia PGA Championship; Zambia's Madalitso Muthiya at the 2016 Vodacom Origins of Golf (Wild Coast); and South Africa's Toto Thimba Jr. at the 2019 KCB Karen Masters.

In 2016, the Sunshine Tour announced an affiliation with the MENA Golf Tour, allowing the top five MENA Tour players Sunshine Tour cards and those 6th-15th into the final stage of Q School. A number of events would also be co-sanctioned among the Sunshine Tour, MENA Tour, and developmental Big Easy Tour.

Schedule

The Sunshine Tour consists of two distinct parts, commonly referred to as the "Summer Swing" and "Winter Swing". Tournaments held during the Summer Swing generally have much higher prize funds and attract stronger fields. The Winter Swing runs from March to November, dividing the Summer Swing in two.

Tournament prize funds do not count directly towards the Order of Merit. The richest events on the tour are those that are co-sanctioned with the European Tour.

Order of Merit winners
The winner of the Sunshine Tour Order of Merit is awarded the Sid Brews Trophy. The Order of Merit winners are shown below. Players are required to play in a minimum number of tournaments (eight in 2013) to qualify for the Order of Merit. As the richest events on the tour (those co-sanctioned by the European Tour) tend to be won by players who don't play enough events to qualify, in recent years the Order of Merit winner has often not actually been the player who won most money in Sunshine Tour sanctioned events. The winner of the Sunshine Tour Order of Merit also earns entry into The Open Championship.

In May 2022, it was announced that the Order of Merit would be reformatted for the 2022–23 season. It was sponsored by Luno, a cryptocurrency platform. The rankings changed to a points-based system, rather than being decided on money earned. Points earned are based on tournament prize money which are split into five tiers. The leader of the OoM will receive ; paid in Bitcoin.

Source (1971–72 to 1992–93):

Notes

References

External links

 
Professional golf tours
Golf in South Africa